"Calling All Angels" is a 2003 song by Train, and the unofficial anthem of the Los Angeles Angels baseball team.

Calling All Angels may also refer to:

 "Calling All Angels" (Jane Siberry song), a 1991 song featured on the soundtracks of the films Until the End of the World (1991) and Pay It Forward (2000)
 "Calling All Angels" (Lenny Kravitz song), 2004